Dominic Oduro (born 13 August 1985) is a Ghanaian professional footballer who plays as a forward.

Early career and education
Oduro started his playing career in Ghana, playing for both Prempeh College and the University of Ghana before transferring to Virginia Commonwealth University in 2004. He appeared in 41 matches for VCU, scoring 18 goals and earning five assists, and being honoured with the 2004 Colonial Athletic Association Player of the Year award and a Third Team All-American spot. Oduro helped the Rams reach the quarterfinals of the 2004 NCAA Tournament, VCU's highest ever appearance. He also played for Richmond Kickers Future in the USL Premier Development League in 2005, scoring 16 goals in 13 games.

Club career

FC Dallas 
Oduro was selected in the second round (22nd overall) of the 2006 MLS SuperDraft by FC Dallas. He made his first team debut on 28 June 2006, as a substitute for Kenny Cooper and scored his first MLS goal on 8 July 2006 against New York Red Bulls. During his three-year stay in Dallas, Oduro impressed fans and coaches with his blazing speed and effort. He was primarily used as a second-half substitute, to provide a spark to the clubs attack, and ultimately appeared in 70 league matches for FC Dallas, with his most productive season coming in 2008 in which he netted 5 goals in 25 matches.

New York Red Bulls 
He was traded to New York Red Bulls on 12 January 2009, while Dave van den Bergh went in the other direction to FC Dallas. In the deal, New York also acquired the #11 and #18 picks in the 2009 MLS SuperDraft while Dallas acquired the No. 14 pick.

Houston Dynamo 
Less than five months later, New York traded Oduro to Houston Dynamo on 27 May 2009 for a first-round pick in the 2010 MLS SuperDraft and a second-round pick in the 2011 MLS SuperDraft. Oduro made his first start for the Houston Dynamo on 1 July 2009 against the USL-1 side Austin Aztex. The game was the third round of the Lamar Hunt US Open Cup. Houston won the match, played at Nelson Field in Austin, Texas, 2–0.

Oduro stayed with Houston through the 2009 and 2010 MLS seasons. After the 2010 season, he decided to make a move overseas but was unsuccessful in securing a contract and re-signed with Houston on 2 March 2011.

Chicago Fire 
After missing a sitter in the opening game of the 2011 season, Oduro was traded to Chicago Fire in exchange for Calen Carr on 23 March 2011. Oduro performed well with Chicago, scoring 12 goals during his first season with the team. For his outstanding play in 2011 he was awarded the Supporters Player of the Year award by Section 8 Chicago, the supporters section of the Chicago Fire.

Columbus Crew 
Oduro was traded to Columbus Crew on 1 February 2013 in exchange for Dilly Duka. He featured for the club for two seasons from 2013 to 2014, playing 43 matches and scoring 13 goals in all competitions.

Toronto FC 
Oduro was traded to Toronto FC on 6 June 2014 for winger Alvaro Rey.

Montreal Impact 
He was traded to Montreal Impact on 27 January 2015 for allocation money. He played from 2015 to 2018, playing 108 matches and scoring 18 goals in all competitions.

San Jose Earthquakes 
Oduro was traded to San Jose Earthquakes on 8 August 2018 for Quincy Amarikwa.

Charlotte Independence 
On 15 February 2019, Oduro signed with Charlotte Independence of the USL Championship. He was released by Charlotte at the end of the 2019 season.

International career
On 26 February 2012, Oduro was called up to the Ghana squad to face Chile. Oduro made his Ghana debut against Chile on 29 February 2012 at PPL Park in Chester, Pennsylvania.

Personal life
Oduro holds a U.S. green card which qualifies him as a domestic player for MLS roster purposes.

Career statistics

Notes

References

External links
 
 

1985 births
Living people
Ghanaian footballers
Association football forwards
Ghana international footballers
Major League Soccer players
USL Championship players
USL League Two players
VCU Rams men's soccer players
FC Dallas draft picks
Richmond Kickers Future players
FC Dallas players
New York Red Bulls players
Houston Dynamo FC players
Chicago Fire FC players
Columbus Crew players
Toronto FC players
CF Montréal players
San Jose Earthquakes players
Charlotte Independence players
Ghanaian expatriate footballers
Ghanaian expatriate sportspeople in Canada
Expatriate soccer players in Canada
Ghanaian expatriate sportspeople in the United States
Expatriate soccer players in the United States